William Alexander Campbell Stewart (17 December 1915 – 23 April 1997) was a Professor of Education and Vice-Chancellor of Keele University.

Early life
Stewart was born in Glasgow but brought up in London where he attended Colfe's Grammar School (1927–34) and University College, London (1934–8) where he obtained a BA degree in English. He obtained a PhD in 1947 from the University of London on which he later based a book, The Quakers and Education.

Career
He was housemaster at the Friends School, Saffron Walden from 1938–43 and then moved to Abbotsholme School, Derbyshire from 1943-44. He lectured in education at University College, Nottingham (now the University of Nottingham) and at the University of Wales in Cardiff from 1944-50. In 1950 Lord Lindsay, the founder of the newly opened University College of North Staffordshire, (now Keele University), appointed him the Chair of Education in 1950. At Keele he built up the department and later the Institute of Education. He became Acting Principal at Keele after the death of Sir George Barnes in 1960. In fact Keele's first three principals had all died in office.

In 1967, after the college had gained university status in 1962, he became Vice-Chancellor, a position he held until 1979.

After retiring he lived in Sussex and had an Honorary Visiting Professorial Fellowship at the University of Sussex. In 1989 he completed and published a survey on Higher Education in Postwar Britain.

Personal life
In 1947 he married Elizabeth (Ella) Burnett, a practising Quaker, and had one son and one daughter.  In 1954 he contracted polio, which left him with a permanently paralysed left arm. He died following a car accident on a return visit to Keele. His funeral was held in the university chapel.

Publications
 The Quakers and Education 1953; Facsimile edition 1971 
 The Educational Innovators, two volumes, 1967–68; Publisher: Macmillan
 Higher Education in Post-War Britain 1989

References

 

1915 births
1997 deaths
Vice-Chancellors of Keele University
Academics of Keele University
Alumni of University College London
Academics of the University of Nottingham
Academics of Cardiff University
Academics of the University of Sussex
Schoolteachers from London
People educated at Colfe's School